Tell Hamis is a town in northeastern Hasakah Governorate, northeastern Syria. The Wadi Jarrah flows through the town. It is the administrative center of the Tell Hamis Subdistrict, consisting of 129 localities.

At the 2004 census, Tell Hamis had a population of 5,161. The inhabitants of the town are predominantly Arabs.

Civil war 
After falling to the Islamic State, it was retaken by Kurdish YPG forces and the Assyrian MFS on February 27, 2015.

See also 
 Syrian civil war

References 

Populated places in Qamishli District